Kieffer is a surname. Notable people with the surname include:

 Aldine Silliman Kieffer (1840–1904), American music writer
 Charles Kieffer (1910–75), American athlete
 Eduardo Gudiño Kieffer (1935–2002), Argentine writer
 Guy-André Kieffer (born 1949), French-Canadian journalist
 John Kieffer, American information theorist
 Josef Kieffer (1900–1947), German Nazi executed for war crimes
 Jean-Jacques Kieffer (1857–1925), French entomologist
 Leo Kieffer (1930–2017), American politician and businessman
 Oliver Kieffer (born 1979), French volleyball player
 Philippe Kieffer (1899–1962), French naval officer
 Robert Kieffer (born 1946), Canadian politician
 Susan Kieffer (born 1942), American geologist

See also
Kiefer

German-language surnames